Mosty may refer to:
 Dlouhé Mosty, part of Františkovy Lázně, Czech Republic
 Mosty u Českého Těšína, village near Český Těšín, Czech Republic, now part of that town
 Mosty u Jablunkova, village in Frýdek-Místek District, Czech Republic
 Mosty, Lublin Voivodeship (east Poland)
 Mosty, Łódź Voivodeship (central Poland)
 Mosty, Świętokrzyskie Voivodeship (south-central Poland)
 Mosty, Lębork County in Pomeranian Voivodeship (north Poland)
 Mosty, Puck County in Pomeranian Voivodeship (north Poland)
 Mosty, Puck County - Mòstë
 Mosty, West Pomeranian Voivodeship (north-west Poland)
 Mosty Wielkie 
 Mosty Małe 
 Nowe Mosty 
 Masty, Belarus